The 4 × 400 metres relay at the 1983 World Championships in Athletics was held at the Helsinki Olympic Stadium on August 13 and August 14.

Medals

Records
Existing records at the start of the event.

Results

Heats
All times shown are in minutes.

Heat 1
 (Alonzo Babers, Willie Smith, Andre Phillips, Michael Franks) 3:06.62 Q
 (Martin Weppler, Jörg Vaihinger, Harald Schmid, Hartmut Weber) 3:07.50 Q
 (Stefano Malinverni, Donato Sabia, Mauro Zuliani, Roberto Ribaud) 3:07.90 Q
 (Antônio Dias Ferreira, Agberto Guimarães, José Luiz Barbosa, Gerson A. Souza) 3:08.25 Q
 (Tommy Johansson, Eric Josjö, Sven Nylander, Per-Erik Olsson) 3:08.33 q
 (Mark Guthrie, Douglas Hinds, Tim Bethune, Brian Saunders) 3:08.37 q
 (Steve Griffiths, George Walcott, Devon Morris, Karl Smith) 3:09.06
 (Jari Niemelä, Mauri Siekkinen, Matti Rusanen, Hannu Mykrä) 3:09.23

Heat 2
 (Gusztáv Menczer, Sándor Újhelyi, István Takács, Sándor Vasvári) 3:09.95 Q
 (Viktor Markin, Sergey Lovachov, Aleksandr Troshchilo, Nikolay Chernetskiy) 3:10.16 Q
 (Kriss Akabusi, Garry Cook, Todd Bennett, Philip Brown) 3:10.19 Q
 (Amadou Dia Ba, Moussa Fall, Babacar Niang, Boubacar Diallo) 3:10.90 Q
 (Bruce Frayne, Gary Minihan, Paul Gilbert, Darren Clark) 3:11.62
 DNS
 DNS

Heat 3
 (Jacques Fellice, Yann Quentrec, Hector Llatser, Aldo Canti) 3:06.99 Q
 (Miroslav Zahořák, Petr Břečka, Dušan Malovec, Ján Tomko) 3:07.03 Q
 (Ryszard Wichrowski, Ryszard Szparak, Andrzej Stępień, Ryszard Podlas) 3:07.18 Q
 (Kazunori Asaba, Tomoharu Isobe, Hirofumi Koike, Susumu Takano) 3:07.23 Q
 (Juan José Prado, Antonio Sánchez, Carlos Azulay, Angel Heras) 3:07.42 q
 (Elijah Bitok, John Anzrah, James Atuti, Juma Ndiwa) 3:07.48 q
 (Georges Kablan Degnan, Rene Djedjemel Meledje, Avognan Nogboum, Gabriel Tiacoh) 3:09.23
 (John Goville, Mike Okot, Charles Mbazira, Moses Kyeswa) DQ

Semi-finals

Heat 1
 (Alonzo Babers, Sunder Nix, Willie Smith, Edwin Moses) 3:02.13 Q
 (Erwin Skamrahl, Jörg Vaihinger, Edgar Nakladal, Harald Schmid) 3:04.96 Q
 (Ryszard Wichrowski, Ryszard Szparak, Andrzej Stępień, Ryszard Podlas) 3:05.51 Q
 (Stefano Malinverni, Donato Sabia, Mauro Zuliani, Roberto Ribaud) 3:05.70 Q
 (Brian Saunders, Douglas Hinds, Ian Newhouse, Tim Bethune) 3:06.42
 (Tomoharu Isobe, Kazunori Asaba, Hirofumi Koike, Susumu Takano) 3:07.11
 (Moussa Fall, Babacar Niang, Mathurin Barry, Amadou Dia Ba) 3:09.63
 (Gusztáv Menczer, Sándor Újhelyi, István Takács, Sándor Vasvári) 3:11.08

Heat 2
 (Sergey Lovachov, Aleksandr Troshchilo, Nikolay Chernetskiy, Viktor Markin) 3:03.75 Q
 (Kriss Akabusi, Garry Cook, Todd Bennett, Philip Brown) 3:04.03 Q
 (Miroslav Zahořák, Petr Břečka, Dušan Malovec, Ján Tomko) 3:04.32 Q
 (Tommy Johansson, Eric Josjö, Sven Nylander, Per-Erik Olsson) 3:04.32 Q
 (Antônio Dias Ferreira, Agberto Guimarães, José Luiz Barbosa, Gerson A. Souza) 3:04.46 (AR)
 (Jacques Fellice, Yann Quentrec, Hector Llatser, Aldo Canti) 3:05.09
 (David Kitur, John Anzrah, James Atuti, James Maina Boi) 3:05.30
 (Juan José Prado, Antonio Sánchez, Carlos Azulay, Angel Heras) 3:09.68

Final
 (Sergey Lovachov, Aleksandr Troshchilo, Nikolay Chernetskiy, Viktor Markin) 3:00.79
 (Erwin Skamrahl, Jörg Vaihinger, Harald Schmid, Hartmut Weber) 3:01.83
 (Ainsley Bennett, Garry Cook, Todd Bennett, Philip Brown) 3:03.53
 (Miroslav Zahořák, Petr Břečka, Dušan Malovec, Ján Tomko) 3:03.90
 (Stefano Malinverni, Donato Sabia, Mauro Zuliani, Roberto Ribaud) 3:05.10
 (Alonzo Babers, Sunder Nix, Willie Smith, Edwin Moses) 3:05.29
 (Tommy Johansson, Eric Josjö, Per-Erik Olsson, Ulf Sedlacek) 3:08.57
 (Ryszard Wichrowski, Ryszard Szparak, Andrzej Stępień, Ryszard Podlas) DNF

References
IAAF results, heats
IAAF results, semi-finals
IAAF results, final

4 x 400 metres relay men
Relays at the World Athletics Championships